Deliatyn settlement territorial hromada is a hromada (municipality) in Ukraine, in Nadvirna Raion of Ivano-Frankivsk Oblast. The administrative center is the urban-type settlement of Deliatyn.

Settlements 
The municipality consists of 1 urban-type settlement (Deliatyn) and 4 villages: Bili Oslavy, Zarichchia, Chorni Oslavy and Chornyi Potik.

References

External links 
 

Nadvirna Raion
Hromadas of Ivano-Frankivsk Oblast
2017 establishments in Ukraine